The Chamber of Deputies is the lower house of Chile's bicameral Congress. Its organisation and its powers and duties are defined in articles 42 to 59 of Chile's current constitution.

Eligibility 
Deputies must: be aged at least 21; not be disqualified from voting; have finished secondary school or its equivalent; and have lived in the corresponding electoral district for at least two years prior to the election.

Electoral system 
Since 2017, Chile's congress has been elected through open list proportional representation under the D'Hondt method.

Before 2017, a unique binomial system was used. These system rewards coalition slates. Each coalition could run two candidates for each electoral district's two Chamber seats. Typically, the two largest coalitions in a district divided the seats, one each, among themselves. Only if the leading coalition ticket out-polls the second-place coalition by a margin of more than two-to-one did the winning coalition gain both seats.
with seats allocated using the simple quotient.
The Chamber of Deputies meets in Chile's National Congress located in the port city of Valparaíso, some 120 km west of the capital, Santiago. The Congress building in Valparaíso replaced the old National Congress, located in downtown Santiago, in 1990

President of the Chamber 
On 11 March 2022, it was agreed that the Presidency of the Chilean Chamber of Deputies would rotate between Raúl Soto (PPD), Karol Cariola (PC), Miguel Ángel Calisto (DC), Yovana Ahumada (PDG), the Broad Front (FA) and Vlado Mirosevic (PL). Likewise, the first and second vice-presidencies were assigned to people who are members of the PR, FA, PS, PC, DC and PPD.

Political composition (2022-2026)

Deputies

2018-2022

2022-2026

See also
List of legislatures by country
List of presidents of the Chamber of Deputies of Chile
National Congress of Chile
Senate of Chile

Notes

References

External links
 

Government of Chile
Chile